Dakar Dem Dikk (DDD) is a national public transport operator in Senegal, and is the main public transport operator of its capital, Dakar.

The company was formed in 2000 as a successor to the former  (Cape Verde Transport Company; SOTRAC). Its Director General is Me Moussa Diop.

In 2015, DDD ordered a fleet of 475 buses from Ashok Leyland  of India, at a cost of 47 million CFA Francs (then 71.6 million Euros). 

As of 2015, it ran seventeen-lines in Dakar, carrying 50 million passengers per year, using 408 buses.

The trade union Dakar Dem Dikk Workers Democratic Union represents their workers.

References

External links 

Dakar
Public transport by city
2000 establishments in Senegal